The Tagoloan River is the 13th largest river system in the Philippines in terms of watershed size, as classified by the National Water Resources Board. It has an estimated drainage area of  covering the provinces of Bukidnon and Misamis Oriental.

References

Rivers of the Philippines
Landforms of Misamis Oriental
Landforms of Bukidnon